Erik Vesa Hämäläinen (born April 20, 1965 in Rauma, Finland) is a left-handed retired Finnish ice hockey defenceman. Hämäläinen currently is an Ice hockey coach, employed by SM-liiga team Lukko

Playing career

Early career
Erik Hämäläinen started his professional career with his hometown team, Rauman Lukko, which played in the Finnish SM-liiga. He debuted during the 1982–1983 Season. Lukko was demoted from SM-liiga after the 82–83 season, but gained promotion by winning the I-Divisioona in 1984. Hämäläinen played for six seasons (1982–1988) in Lukko. His last was cut short when an injury sidelined him for the most of the season.

In 1989, Hämäläinen moved to Kuopio and started to play for KalPa. He stayed with KalPa for four Seasons (1989–1992) before transferring to Helsingin Jokerit in 1992. During his three-year stint with Jokerit, he won a gold and silver medal to accompany his two silver medals from KalPa and Lukko. He also won the European bronze medal during his first season with Jokerit.

World Championship victory and move to Sweden
After winning the 1995 World Championships with Finland, Hämäläinen was acquired by AIK. He played with the Swedish team for three seasons (1995–1998). He returned to his old team of Rauman Lukko in 1998. During his three seasons with Lukko, he played twice in the playoffs, but the team failed to get a place in the finals.

To Switzerland
During the 2000–2001 season, Hämäläinen moved to play for SC Langnau, a Swiss team. After a disappointing season in Switzerland, he returned again to Rauma Lukko.

Late career and retirement
During the 2005–2006 season, he broke the record for most SM-liiga games played with his 865th game; the previous record was held by Pertti Lehtonen. Hämäläinen's record was broken 18 February 2012 when Jan Latvala played his 1002nd game.

Hämäläinen played his last season during the 2007-08 SM-liiga season. Hämäläinen played his 1000th SM-liiga career game and after the season ended he announced his retirement from playing

Coaching career
Shortly after his announcement regarding his retirement, Hämäläinen was contracted to a 2+2 year contract by Lukko. Hämäläinen will start as an Assistant Coach for Lukko in the beginning of 2008–2009 SM-liiga season.

International play

Hämäläinen has played 108 games for Finland's national ice hockey team. He participated in four World Championship Tournaments (1992, 1993, 1994 and 1995), winning one gold medal (1995), two silver medals (1992, 1994). He was also part of the 1994 Olympic ice hockey team in Lillehammer, where the team won the bronze medal.

Career statistics

Regular season and playoffs

International

External links
 

1965 births
AIK IF players
Detroit Red Wings draft picks
Finnish ice hockey defencemen
Finnish ice hockey world championship gold medalists
Ice hockey players at the 1994 Winter Olympics
Jokerit players
KalPa players
Living people
Lukko players
Medalists at the 1994 Winter Olympics
Olympic bronze medalists for Finland
Olympic ice hockey players of Finland
Olympic medalists in ice hockey
People from Rauma, Finland
Sportspeople from Satakunta